The Edward Stark House is a historic house at 21 Oread Street in Worcester, Massachusetts.

History
The -story Queen Anne Victorian house was built in 1880 for Edward H. Stark, owner of a boot and shoe factory.  It is principally brick, with sandstone trim, and resting on a sandstone block foundation.  Its features include a rounded bay that rises to a conical turret, and a porch with turned balusters and pillars.  It was designed by John B. Woodworth, a local architect, and is the finest known example of his work.

The house was listed on the National Register of Historic Places in 1980.

See also
Norcross Brothers Houses, similar buildings nearby
National Register of Historic Places listings in southwestern Worcester, Massachusetts
National Register of Historic Places listings in Worcester County, Massachusetts

References

Houses in Worcester, Massachusetts
Queen Anne architecture in Massachusetts
Houses completed in 1880
National Register of Historic Places in Worcester, Massachusetts
Houses on the National Register of Historic Places in Worcester County, Massachusetts